The 2010–11 Chiapas season was the 64th professional season of Mexico's top-flight football league. The season is split into two tournaments—the Torneo Apertura and the Torneo Clausura—each with identical formats and each contested by the same eighteen teams. Chiapas began their season on July 24, 2010 against Necaxa, Chiapas will play their homes games on Saturdays at 5:00pm.

Torneo Apertura

Squad

Regular season

Final phase

Goalscorers

Transfers

In

Out

Results

Results summary

Results by round

Torneo Clausura

Squad 

 (Captain)

Regular season

Goalscorers

Results

Results summary

Results by round

References 

2010–11 Primera División de México season
Mexican football clubs 2010–11 season